Football Club Shakhtar Donetsk (short nickname "miners") is a Ukrainian professional football club from the city of Donetsk. In 2014, due to the War in Donbass, the club was forced to move to Lviv, and  had played matches in Lviv (2014–2016) and in Kharkiv (2017–2020) whilst having its office headquarters and training facilities in Kyiv. In May 2020, Shakhtar started to play home matches at NSC Olimpiyskiy in Kyiv.

Shakhtar has appeared in several European competitions and is often a participant in the UEFA Champions League. The club became the first club in independent Ukraine to win the UEFA Cup in 2009, the last year before the competition was revamped as the Europa League. FC Shakhtar Donetsk is one of two Ukrainian clubs, the other being Dynamo Kyiv, who have won a major UEFA competition.

The club formerly played its home matches in Donetsk at the newly built Donbass Arena, however due to the Russo-Ukrainian War in 2014, the team were forced to relocate  to the west in Arena Lviv in the interim. Following the winter break of the 2016–17 season the club then moved again to the Metalist Stadium in Kharkiv ( to the northwest of Donetsk) early in 2017. In May–July 2020 Shakhtar played home matches at NSC Olimpiyskiy in Kyiv.

Shakhtar Donetsk is one of Ukraine's most popular football clubs, and is particularly favoured in the eastern Donbas region.

The club draws its history from the very start of the Soviet football league competitions and is one of the oldest clubs in Ukraine. The club was a member of the Soviet Voluntary Sports Society of Shakhtyor, having connections with other Soviet teams from Karaganda (Kazakhstan), Soligorsk (Belarus), among others. In the late Soviet period, Shakhtar was considered a tough mid-table club of the Soviet Top League and a cup competition specialist after winning the Soviet Cup two years in a row in 1961 and 1962.

The team has played under the following names: Stakhanovets (1936–46), Shakhtyor (Shakhtar) (1946–92), and FC Shakhtar (1992–present).

History

Early years – first two decades

The Shakhtar club  was originally formed on a decision of the All-Union Council on physical culture and sports of 3 April 1936. It was initially named Stakhanovets, meaning "the participant of Stakhanovite movement", which derived from Aleksei Stakhanov, a coal-miner in the Donets basin and propaganda celebrity in 1935. The first team was based upon two other local teams, the participants of the All-Ukrainian Spartakiads: Dynamo Horlivka and Dynamo Stalino. The first game was against Dynamo Odesa as part of the 1936 Cup of the Ukrainian SSR (at that time known as Ukrainian spring challenge) and took place on 12 May 1936 at Balitsky Stadium in Horlivka (the first home stadium). The team that played as Stakhonovets Horlivka lost 3–2 after scoring the first goal by Mykhailo Pashchenko, the second goal belonged to Boris Terentiev.

Its first league game in Group V took place on 24 May 1936 against Dynamo Kazan was even more disappointing, which miners lost 4–1. Stakhonovets that had on its roster 15 players left for Kazan by train on 20 May. Beside players, as part of delegation there were representative of regional council of physical culture Gololobov and republican referee I.Rozanov. The team returned to Stalino on 28 May and the same day Gololobov in interview to newspaper "Stalinskiy rabochiy" told that "... the game in Kazan with local "Dynamo" was witnessed by 3,000 spectators. With the first minutes, the field hosts offered a high pace. 

The "Miners", who were road weary, could not respond with the same. On the 13th minute they conceded the first goal and by the end of first half, two more. In many respects the reason was poor performance of right halfback Kutsev (who played instead of K.Pashchenko) and right outside forward Korotynsky. Through their flank Dynamo players successfully attacked. In the first half Stakhanovets forwards looked bleak and uncertain. In the second half the game equalized and on 55th minute Fedor Manov opened score to Donetsk team goals. Final score is 4:1 in favor of the hosts."

Nonetheless, the selective job conducted constructively by the club's administration allowed the club to compete successfully at the top level by the end of the 1930s. During the war championship of 1941, which was interrupted unexpectedly, the club defeated Soviet champions Dynamo Moscow and after about ten games were placed in fifth in the league. In the last game of that championship, played on 24 June, two days after the start of the Great Patriotic War, which they lost at home to Traktor Stalingrad. During the war many players went to frontlines and perished among which are Ivan Ustinov, Ivan Putyatov, Volodymyr Shkurov, Ivan Horobets, Mykhailo Vasin and others. From the pre-war squad in 1945 there were left only three players Georgiy Bikezin, Mykola Kuznetsov, and Petro Yurchenko.

The All-Union coal mining society of Stakhanovite (Stakhanovets) had changed its name in July 1946 to Shakhtyor (Shakhter) and so did the Sports Society of Donbas Miners. In 1950, Viktor Fomin was named Ukrainian Footballer of the Year, despite the club finishing only 11th in the league. The first success for the team was in 1951, when it achieved third place in the USSR Championship. The most notable player of that achievement was the striker Aleksandr Ponomarev, who came to finish his football career in Donbas, the region he was born in, and was named Ukrainian Footballer of the Year for 1951. Despite the latest achievement, Shakhtar was relegated at the end of the 1952 season and as part of the re-organization of the team, former player Aleksandr Ponomarev became the head coach of the club. In 1954, Shakhtar under Ponomarev won the Class B League, thus sealing a return to the top league.

Cup triumphs and establishment in the Soviet League

In 1958, the players of the club received fewer yellow and red cards than any other team in the championship, for what the Sovetsky Sport newspaper awarded the club with the "Fair Play Award."
In the 1960s, Shakhtar, under Oleg Oshenkov's coaching, were three-time USSR Cup finalists, winning it twice in 1961 and 1962. Among the players playing for the club then where defenders Viacheslav Aliabiev and Vladimir Salkov. The club was nicknamed "The Cup Team" due to Shakhtar's success in vying for the trophy every year. The Miners’ more notable achievements, however, occurred later from the mid-1970s to the early 1980s.

Despite the departure of the team's leader midfielder Anatoliy Konkov, in 1975, Shakhtar under management of former player Vladimir Salkov, earned second place in the USSR Championship and received the right to represent the Soviet Union in European competition. At the end of the season, Shakhtar received the Progress Cup for making the biggest progress from previous season in the league. They received the award again in 1977. In 1978, Shakhtar finished third in the USSR Championship.

In 1979, the team finished second in the league campaign and its captain—striker Vitaliy Starukhin—became the top scorer in the USSR Championship with 26 goals scored, also being named Soviet Footballer of the Year. The club was only two points away from the first place, despite having important players leaving the club before the season, and other important players receiving injuries. 

Other important players besides Starukhin at the time were Mykhaylo Sokolovsky, who went on to set a caps record for the club (for what he received the Club Loyalty Award in 1987), defenders Viktor Zvyahintsev and Valeriy Horbunov, who both made it numerous times to the 33 Top Players of the Soviet Championship lists, and goalkeeper Yuriy Dehteryov, who was named Soviet goalkeeper of the year and took third place for Soviet Footballer of the Year in 1977.

Shakhtar twice, in 1980 and 1983, brought home the crystal USSR Cup to Donetsk and in 1983, it won the USSR Super Cup over then-domestic league champions Dnipro Dnipropetrovsk. Shakhtar reached the 1983–84 European Cup Winners' Cup quarter-final, and strikers Viktor Hrachov and Serhiy N. Morozov became joint top scorers of the tournament. In 1987, Shakhtar received the fewest yellow and red cards in the championship, for which the club was awarded the "Soviet Top League Fair Play Award" by Man and Law magazine. Between 1982 and 1988, Shakhtar received the "Together With The Club" award five times, an award given for good organization of home games and behaviour of the home fans.

First decade in independent Ukraine – the beginning of the Akhmetov era
In the newly independent Ukraine, Shakhtar, along with Dynamo Kyiv, became perennial first place competitors. In October 1995, a bombing-assassination took place at the team's stadium, killing club president Akhat Bragin. In 1996, Rinat Akhmetov took over as president and invested heavily in the club.

Despite Shakhtar not being a strong contender for the championship at the time, finishing second many times with a large point gap from the first-place position, they won the Ukrainian Cup three times, in 1995 (under the management of former player Vladimir Salkov), 1997 and 2001. In the 1997–98 UEFA Cup Winners' Cup, Shakhtar were eliminated after a 5–2 aggregate loss to Vicenza, losing the first and second legs. Important players at the time were defenders Serhiy Popov and Mykhaylo Starostyak, goalkeeper Dmytro Shutkov, striker Oleh Matveyev (who was top scorer of the Premier League in the 1996–97 season), and midfielders Hennadiy Orbu, Valeriy Kriventsov and Ihor Petrov. Most of the players playing for the team of the time came through the team's youth ranks.

Towards the end of the decade, the team finally started to look like a team able to become champion. In 1999, a Shakhtar football academy was opened and now hosts football training for roughly 3,000 youth. In 2000, Andriy Vorobey was named Ukrainian Footballer of the Year by Komanda, the first Shakhtar player in independent Ukraine to do so, and became the top scorer in the 2000–01 Ukrainian Premier League. That year, Shakhtar competed in the UEFA Champions League for the first time, drawn in a group with Lazio, Arsenal and Sparta Prague. They finished third in the group, qualifying for the UEFA Cup after a 3–0 home win against Arsenal.

First league triumph

The club won its first ever Ukrainian Premier League title in the 2001–02 season under coach Nevio Scala, winning by a single point over Dynamo Kyiv. They were also victorious in the 2001–02 Ukrainian Cup, defeating Dynamo 3–2 after extra time in the final. Among the key players at the club at the time were captain defensive midfielder Anatoliy Tymoshchuk, striker Andriy Vorobey, midfielder Hennadiy Zubov and defender Mykhaylo Starostyak. At the end of the season, Tymoshchuk, who emerged as the club's leader on the field, was named Ukrainian Footballer of the Year by Komanda and Ukrainskiy Football.

After multiple managerial changes, in 2004 the Romanian Mircea Lucescu was invited to build a team in Shakhtar. After ten days at the club, he won the 2003–04 Ukrainian Cup and after three months, for the first time in club history, the club made it to the UEFA Champions League group stage, which won him the 2004 Romania Coach of the Year title. The strategy chosen was looking for young talented players in Brazil, which was to form the base of the attack, while the defence would supplied by largely Ukrainian talent in order to adjust to rules forcing teams to have a certain number of local players on the field. 

The large amount of Brazilians arriving at the club earned Shakhtar the nickname "the most Brazilian club in Europe". They won their second Premier League title in the 2004–05 season, but lost to Dynamo Kyiv in the inaugural Ukrainian Super Cup tournament in 2004. They finished as runners up in the 2004–05 Ukrainian Cup, losing to Dynamo in a penalty shoot-out the final.

They retained the Premier League crown in the 2005–06 season and managed to avenge the defeat to Dynamo in the previous Super Cup by defeating them on penalties to win their first-ever Super Cup title. At the end of the season, Anatoliy Tymoshchuk was named Ukrainian Footballer of the Year for by Ukrainskiy Football for the second time, becoming the first Shakhtar player to be named so more than once. Brazilian striker Brandão became the league's joint top scorer.

Shakhtar appeared in all three editions of the Channel One Cup, winning the 2007 edition and finishing runners-up in 2008. Having missed out on the league title in 2006–07, Shakhtar regained the title in 2007–08, also being victorious in the Ukrainian Cup after defeating Dynamo Kyiv 2–0 in the final.
Shakhtar's attendance levels at league matches have continually risen over the years to a point where they averaged 36,983 spectators over the 2011–12 Premier League season.

UEFA Cup triumph and domination in Ukraine

In 2009, they became only the second Ukrainian team to win a European competition (and the first since independence), and the first to win the UEFA Cup after defeating Werder Bremen in the final, with goals from Brazilians Luiz Adriano and Jádson. The victory earned the player Mariusz Lewandowski the 2009 Polish Footballer of the Year award. This also made them the last UEFA Cup winners before the tournament was rebranded as the UEFA Europa League.

Before the start of the 2009–10 season, Shakhtar won the friendly Uhrencup tournament. Shakhtar won the Premier League title in the 2009–10 season, goalkeeper Andriy Pyatov was named Ukraine Premier League MVP by Komanda, and Manager Mircea Lucescu was named Romania Coach of the Year for the second time. The 2010–11 season was a very successful one for Shakhtar. They reached the quarter-finals of the Champions League, their then-best-ever performance in the competition. 

Captain Darijo Srna was chosen to be part of the Champions League Team of the Season as voted by fans. They also won a domestic treble with victory in the Premier League, Ukrainian Cup and the Super Cup. The successful season did not go unnoticed by the experts, and in 2011, the IFFHS gave Shakhtar a special award for making the biggest progress of the decade among football clubs.

They went on to win the Premier League and Ukrainian Cup in the 2011–12 season. Shakhtar player Yevhen Seleznyov topped the goal scoring charts in the league, with 14 goals, midfielder Henrikh Mkhitaryan was named Armenian Footballer of the Year, and manager Mircea Lucescu was named 2012 Romania Coach of the Year, receiving the award for the third time. The main players at that time were captain Darijo Srna, defender Yaroslav Rakitskiy, Armenian midfielder Henrikh Mkhitaryan (who was named Armenian Footballer of the Year twice while playing for Shakhtar) and Brazilian midfielders Fernandinho and Willian.

In the 2012–13 season Shakhtar won the Premier League, Cup and Super Cup. Henrikh Mkhitaryan became the top scorer of the league, setting a Ukrainian championship record of 25 goals. He was also named the Ukraine Premier League MVP by Komanda, Armenian Footballer of the Year and the CIS Footballer of the Year for 2012.

Leaders depart, new titles and war in Donbas
Prior to the 2013–14 season, many of the club's main players were sold after Shakhtar accepted high bids for them – Henrikh Mkhitaryan, Fernandinho and Willian brought the club over €100 million. Shakhtar spent the following summer trying to integrate new young players into the team, who along with the remaining players were to form the backbone of the renewed Shakhtar. Despite selling its leaders, before the 2013–14 season, Shakhtar set a new record for East Europe for number of season tickets sold. Before the beginning of the 2013–14 season, Shakhtar won two friendly tournaments in Abu Dhabi, the Match World Cup, and the Super Cup of Champions played against Russian champions Zenit Saint Petersburg. 

In the mid-season break, Shakhtar won the 2014 United Supercup (the second edition of the United Tournament), a tournament between the top-two placed clubs of Ukraine and of Russia, which strengthened Shakhtar's status as the strongest club in Eastern Europe. At the end of the 2013–14 season, Shakhtar won the Ukraine Premier League, while Luiz Adriano was the league top scorer. Shakhtar also won the 2014 Ukrainian Super Cup, holding the trophy for the sixth time. Manager Mircea Lucescu was named the 2014 Romania Coach of the Year, receiving the award for the fourth time.

Due to the war in Donbas, Shakhtar had to temporarily move and play its games in Arena Lviv, resulting in very low attendance. As an anti-war protest, the players of Shakhtar refused the initiative to wear the "Glory to the Ukrainian Army" shirts. In the 2014–15 UEFA Champions League, Shakhtar finished second in the group stage, therefore qualifying to the next stage. Striker Luiz Adriano equaled both Lionel Messi's record of five goals in a Champions League match and Cristiano Ronaldo's record of scoring nine goals in the group stage; as a result, UEFA named him MVP of the competition's group stage. Shakhtar finished the season second in the 2014–15 Ukrainian Premier League after playing the whole season away from Donbas, with Alex Teixeira finishing as a joint top scorer in the league. At the end of the season, Douglas Costa was sold to Bayern Munich, while Luiz Adriano moved to Milan.

While the club itself moved to a Ukraine-controlled zone, a few prominent Shakhtar players remained in the Donetsk People's Republic and supported the unrecognised state. Among them were former defender Viktor Zvyahintsev, former goalkeeper Yuriy Dehteryov, former Shakhtar and Ukraine national football team captain Ihor Petrov, and the club's first press officer Vyacheslav Sharafutdinov.

During the 2015–16 Ukrainian Premier League, on 16 October, Shakhtar beat Dynamo Kyiv 3–0 in Kyiv and set two new records. One record was that for the first time during a Ukrainian derby game in Kyiv a team scored three goals. The other record was that for the first time Shakhtar had more Ukrainian derby victories, 26, than Dynamo. In the middle of the season, Alex Teixeira moved to Chinese club Jiangsu Suning for a fee of €50 million, breaking both the Asian and Ukrainian transfer record. The club finished the 2015/16 season as runner up and Marlos was recognised best league player by Komanda. After the 2015–16 season, long-time manager Mircea Lucescu moved on to Zenit Saint Petersburg; he was replaced by the Portuguese Paulo Fonseca, previously of Braga.

Following the winter break of the 2016–17 season, a season when the club won the league, the cup, and the supercup, the club moved to the Metalist Stadium in Kharkiv (241 km  to the north of Donetsk). In 2017–18, the club won the league and the cup again, with Facundo Ferreyra becoming the league top scorer and Marlos the league assist leader. In the 2018–19 season, the club won Ukrainian Premier League for the third time in a row. In 2019–20, Shakhtar retained their league title for the fourth time in a row. They also reached the semi-finals of the 2019–20 UEFA Europa League.

Infrastructure

Until 2009 Shakhtar had been playing most of its games at the RSC Olimpiyskiy stadium which is a property of administration of Donetsk Oblast and the Serhiy Bubka College of Olympic Reserve. The stadium was built during Soviet period for another Donetsk club, FC Lokomotyv Donetsk and carried its name.

On 29 August 2009 the construction of its new stadium, Donbass Arena, was accomplished and the stadium was opened. Located in the City Park of Culture and Recreation, it has a capacity of 50,149 and has been honored with a UEFA five star rating, the highest rating achievable.

Shakhtar's old home, the central Shakhtar Stadium which was built in 1936 and reconstructed four times, is currently being used by Shakhtar Donetsk Reserves. The stadium received some major renovations, including the installation of bench seats in 2000 when Shakhtar made it to the Champions League Group Stage.

A mascot mole (moles is a nickname for the club) will entertain spectators during the home matches. Shakhtar are rated 40th by the average game attendance, being the top eastern European club on the rating charts. Before the 2013–14 season, Shakhtar set a new record for Eastern Europe for number of season tickets sold, selling 27,000 season tickets, which means 52% of the seats in Donbass Arena belong to season ticket holders.

From 2014 until the end of 2016, due to the war in Donbas, Shakhtar played its home matches at the Arena Lviv. Following the winter break of the 2016–17 season the club moved to the Metalist Stadium in Kharkiv (250 kilometers to the northwest of Donetsk).

Training centre
Shakhtar Donetsk has its own training facilities for its first team, reserve team and youth academy all located at Kirsha Training Centre.

Due to the war conditions in the eastern Ukraine, Shakhtar temporary venue for its home matches has changed several times, while it was announced that the team will use training facilities in Kyiv.

Youth, academy and reserves
The club used to field a couple of reserve teams that competed at professional level. By 2015 all reserve teams such as FC Shakhtar-2 Donetsk and FC Shakhtar-3 Donetsk were withdrawn from professional competitions. The club however fields its youth Shakhtar U-21 team in the youth championship of Ukrainian Premier League. Shakhtar also has its football academy that fields four teams in a special youth league designated for teenagers. Since 2012 the club also has a team for the U-19 championship of Ukrainian Premier League.

During the Soviet times the club used to have one youth team named Shakhter-D Donetsk that participated in a separate Soviet championship for doubles. Shakhter-D later was reorganized into FC Shakhtar-2 Donetsk and admitted to the Ukrainian First League.

Due to the 2022 invasion of Ukraine, the youth academy has relocated to Split, Croatia.

Crests and colours

The first logo of the club was designed in 1936, it featured a blue hexagon, with a red 'S' in the middle, crossed over by a jackhammer. In 1946, when the club was renamed, the logo was changed to black and white, with addition of club's name. Later, in the middle of the 1960s, their logo depicted two crossed hammers, with "Shakhtar Donetsk" written in the circle. The crest was added to the kit and remained there since, except for several seasons in the beginning of the 1990s. The club's name was depicted in the Russian language until the latest logo was chosen. Therefore, some sources have its name written often as "Shakhter" or rarely "Shakhtyor."

In 1989, an artist, Viktor Savilov, on the event of the club restructuring offered a draft variant of a logo with elements of the ball and a pitch. Some time later, the logo was remodelled into the present one. The emblem was added to the kit in 1997.

In 2007, during the presentation of the club's new stadium, Shakhtar's new logo was unveiled. For the first time in over 30 years, the crossed hammers, the traditional symbols of the club, were present on the crest. Also, for the first time the name was written in the Ukrainian language and not Russian.

Since 1961 the official colours are black and orange.

Kit suppliers and shirt sponsors

Supporters and rivalries

The first riots associated with Shakhtar fans took place on 20 September 1959 in the match against CSKA Moscow, when several dozen Shakhtar supporters ran onto the field, and as a result the match was frustrated. In all matches involving Donetsk, many people came that promoted the development of fan movement in Donetsk. Active development of football movement began in the early 1980s. In the early 2000s to the Ukrainian stadiums came English style – hooliganism. In 2003, during the final of the Ukrainian Cup there was a fierce fight between Dynamo and Shakhtar fans.

The other rivalry was with Metalurh Donetsk. This was another local club and, although not as significant as games against the rivals from the capital, the games between the two Donetsk teams were proclaimed the Donetsk Derby. Metalurh went bankrupt in July 2015.

Among the extinguished rivalries are the games against Spartak Moscow and, particularly, the third place champions Dinamo Tbilisi of Georgia that took place at times during the Soviet Top League. Another interesting rivalry, the Donbas Derby, is with Zorya Luhansk, which gathered a significant crowd in Luhansk. During the early Ukrainian championships, another interesting rivalry developed with Chornomorets Odesa labelled the "Miners vs. Sailors", which declined with the turn of the millennium due to the inconsistent performance of the Odesa-based club.

Honours

Ukrainian competitions
Ukrainian Premier League 
Winners (13): 2001–02, 2004–05, 2005–06, 2007–08, 2009–10, 2010–11, 2011–12, 2012–13, 2013–14, 2016–17, 2017–18, 2018–19, 2019–20

Ukrainian Cup 
Winners (13): 1994–95, 1996–97, 2000–01, 2001–02, 2003–04, 2007–08, 2010–11, 2011–12, 2012–13, 2015–16, 2016–17, 2017–18, 2018–19

Ukrainian Super Cup
Winners (9): 2005, 2008, 2010, 2012, 2013, 2014, 2015, 2017, 2021

Soviet competitions
Soviet Cup 
Winners (4): 1961, 1962, 1980, 1983

Soviet First League
Winners (1): 1954

Season's Cup (unofficial tournament as Super Cup)
Winners (1): 1984

European competitions
UEFA Cup
Winners (1): 2008–09

UEFA club coefficient ranking

Friendly competitions
Channel One Cup: 2006
La Manga Cup : 2008
Uhrencup: 2009
Copa del Sol: 2010, 2013
Salzburgerland Cup: 2011
United Tournament/United Supercup: 2014
IFA Shield (IFA) runners-up: 1985

Team awards
Special award from the IFFHS for making the biggest progress of the decade, 2011.

Individual player awards
Several players have won individual awards during or for their time with Shakhtar Donetsk.

Soviet Footballer of the Year
 Vitaliy Starukhin (1979)

Footballer of the Year in Baltic and Commonwealth of Independent States
 Henrikh Mkhitaryan (2012)

Ukrainian Footballer of the Year
 Viktor Fomin (1950)
 Aleksandr Ponomarev (1951)
 Vitaliy Starukhin (1979)
 Anatoliy Tymoshchuk (2002, 2006, 2007)
 Mykhailo Mudryk (2022)

Ukraine Premier League MVP
As awarded by the Komanda newspaper
 Andriy Vorobey (2000)
 Anatoliy Tymoshchuk (2002)
 Andriy Pyatov (2010)
 Henrikh Mkhitaryan (2012)
 Alex Teixeira (2015)
  Marlos (2016–18)
 Taison (2019)

Armenian Footballer of the Year
 Henrikh Mkhitaryan (2011, 2012)

Polish Footballer of the Year
 Mariusz Lewandowski (2009)

Soviet Goalkeeper of the Year
 Yuriy Dehteryov (1977)

Club Loyalty Award
 Mykhaylo Sokolovsky (1987)

Romania Coach of the Year
 Mircea Lucescu (2004, 2010, 2012, 2014)

Players

First team squad

Out on loan

Retired numbers

Under-19 team squad

Coaches and administration

Presidents and other officials

Presidents
 1989–1994: Ivan Haivoronskyi
 1992–1995: Akhat Bragin
 1996–present: Rinat Akhmetov

Chairmen of the Board
 1990–1992: Oleksandr Kosevych (chair of the board)
 2006–present: Oleh Popov (chair of council of directors)

Vice Presidents
 1994–1995: Ivan Haivoronskyi
 1994–2000: Ravil Safiullin
 1998–present: Borys Kolesnikov

General directors
 2004–present: Serhiy Palkin (financial director in 2003-2004)

Director of Football
 2020–present:  Darijo Srna

Player records

Top goalscorers

As of 21 May 2016

Other – National Super Cup

Most appearances

Other – National Super Cup

Notable coaches

League and Cup history

Soviet Union

Ukraine

European history

Shakhtar Donetsk has participated in European competition since 1976, playing its first game against Berliner FC Dynamo in the UEFA Cup. Since 1997, the club has participated in UEFA competition annually with variable amounts of success, and first took part in the UEFA Champions League competition in 2000. Shakhtar Donetsk played against Arsenal, Lazio and Sparta Prague upon qualifying for the group stage for the first time in 2000–01.

Notes

References

External links

Official website
Shakhtar news on Tribuna.com
FC Shakhtar youtube channel

 
Football clubs in Donetsk
Association football clubs established in 1936
Mining association football teams in Ukraine
Police association football clubs in Ukraine
1936 establishments in Ukraine
Soviet Top League clubs
Ukrainian Premier League clubs
SCM Holdings
Football clubs in the Ukrainian Soviet Socialist Republic
Shakhtar Donetsk
Shakhter Voluntary Sports Society
UEFA Cup winning clubs
Sports team relocations
Dynamo (Ukraine)